EMST may refer to:
 Euclidean minimum spanning tree, a type of subgraph used in graph theory
 Early Management of Severe Trauma, an alternative name for Advanced Trauma Life Support commonly used outside North America
 National Museum of Contemporary Art, Athens
 The Dutch town of Emst